The Slough Arm is a short canal branch from the Grand Union Main Line to Slough in Berkshire (before 1974 in Buckinghamshire), England. It was originally opened to serve the brick-making industry.  The last commercial traffic was carried in 1960, but as the plans to fill it in were opposed locally, the stretch was re-opened in 1975 and has remained in use since.

History
With the demand for bricks for the buildings of London continuing to increase, a canal branch to Slough was first proposed in 1878 by Hubert Thomas.  It would run from Bulls Bridge on the Grand Union Canal (then the Grand Junction Canal) to Slough, where new brickworks would be opened.  Thomas completed a survey in 1879, and the route was altered slightly, with the junction moving to Cowley Peachey.  An Act of Parliament was sought, which was opposed by the Great Western Railway, but despite this, the Act was passed in July 1879, although the Slough end was truncated back to Stoke Road, as the original terminus would have crossed lands owned by the Duke of Leeds and Eton College.

Construction began at the Cowley Peachey Junction in early 1880, overseen by Alfred Walker, who had recently constructed the Melton Mowbray Canal.  The route included a major cutting and embankment at Iver, which were started in February and May respectively.  By April 1881, work was also in progress at the Slough end.  The major earthworks at Iver were completed in June 1882, and the canal opened throughout on 4 December 1882. It was about 5 miles (8 km) long, and did not require any locks.

Walker remained after the canal opened to oversee the construction of wharves and landing places, to sort out any problems resulting from settlement of the formation, and to ensure that traffic developed in a satisfactory way.  This he seemed to achieve, for in 1905 the canal conveyed 192,000 tons of cargo, mainly bricks, sand and gravel, for which the tolls were £7,164.  A number of tramways facilitated the carriage of goods to the canal wharves.

From the peak year of 1905, a steady decline set in.  Cargoes of bricks and gravel sustained the canal through the 1920s and 1930s but by the 1940s, the deposits of clay and gravel were becoming exhausted.  The pits were then used for landfill, which provided some traffic, and there was a trade in timber, which was delivered to Slough Wharf, but the last commercial use of the canal was in March 1960.  With the British Waterways Board taking over the canals in the 1960s, the Arm was not considered worth saving.

Restoration
With no likelihood of the canal being used again, Slough Council proposed buying part of it and building an access road for a trading estate along its route.  The Slough Canal Group was formed in 1968, and fought a vigorous campaign to save the canal, supported by the local newspaper, the Slough Observer.  They were successful, and the canal was re-opened in 1975. The Slough Arm was one of seven stretches of canal, formally designated as remainder waterways, which were re-classified by the British Waterways Act of 8 February 1983. Under the act, a total of 82 route miles (132 km) were upgraded to Cruising Waterway Standard.

The canal was one of the last to be built in Britain, with only the Manchester Ship Canal and the New Junction Canal, which was opened in 1905, being built at a later date.

Thames Link plans
There have been proposals to build a link from the end of the Slough Arm to join the River Thames, a distance of approximately 2 miles (3 km) at the closest point in the centre of Slough.  British Waterways (BWB) have estimated that this would cost about £30m. The plan was proposed in 2008, and confirmed in 2012 as a long-term objective when the economic climate allows.

The route
The route of the canal starts at its junction with the Grand Union Canal, where there are a set of stop gates, and immediately crosses over the Frays River, the River Colne and the Colne Brook in three aqueducts.  Passing under the M25 motorway, it enters the Iver cutting, to emerge near the main line railway from Paddington. The two routes pass along the northern edges of Slough, and then the canal diverges northwards, to end at Stoke Road.  Apart from the last mile, it is surprisingly rural in nature.

Points of interest

Bibliography

References

See also

 Canals of Great Britain
 History of the British canal system
Friends of Slough Canal

Canals in Buckinghamshire
Canals in Berkshire
Canals in England 
Transport in Slough
Canals opened in 1882